Larroque may refer to the following communes in France:

Larroque, Haute-Garonne, in the Haute-Garonne department
Larroque, Hautes-Pyrénées, in the Hautes-Pyrénées department
Larroque, Tarn, in the Tarn department
Larroque-Engalin, in the Gers department
Larroque-Saint-Sernin, in the Gers department
Larroque-sur-l'Osse, in the Gers department
Larroque-Toirac, in the Lot department

Larroque may also refer to:

Larroque, Entre Ríos, a town in Argentina

See also
 Laroque (disambiguation)
 La Roque (disambiguation)
 Larock (disambiguation)